The Mediterranean Grand Prix was a non-Championship motor race, held at the Autodromo di Pergusa, in Sicily, Italy. The first event, run to Formula One rules, took place in 1962. The last Formula One event took place in 1965 before the race switched to Formula Two rules. In 1985, Formula Two was replaced by Formula 3000 and the Mediterranean Grand Prix remained on the calendar.

The event is scheduled to return in 2020 as part of the Euroformula Open Championship.

Results

References